Marcel Renault (14 May 1872 – 26 May 1903) was a French racing driver and industrialist, co-founder of the carmaker Renault. He was the brother of Louis and Fernand Renault.

Renault was born in Paris; he and his brothers jointly founded the Renault company on 25 February 1899. He and Louis raced the cars it built starting the next year. He died in Payré, at the age of 31, of severe injuries he sustained during the Paris-Madrid race.

After his death, a statue was built in Renault's memory which later would be destroyed by the German attacks during World War II.

External links
History of Renault with Marcel
Historic Racing: Marcel Renault

1872 births
1903 deaths
Automotive businesspeople
Burials at Passy Cemetery
French automotive engineers
French founders of automobile manufacturers
French racing drivers
Racing drivers who died while racing
Renault people
Sport deaths in France